Scott Covered Bridge may refer to:

Scott Covered Bridge (Rogersville, Pennsylvania), listed on the National Register of Historic Places in Greene County, Pennsylvania
Scott Covered Bridge (Townshend, Vermont), listed on the National Register of Historic Places in Windham County, Vermont